Hacienda is the eighth studio album by Grammy Award nominated Jazz band Jeff Lorber Fusion. Hacienda was nominated for Best Pop Instrumental Album at the 56th Annual Grammy Awards (held on January 26, 2014) losing to Herb Alpert for Steppin' Out.

Track listing
All tracks composed by Jeff Lorber; except where indicated
 "Corinaldo" - 4:28 
 "Solar Wind" - 4:58; Featuring Larry Koonse
 "King Kong" - 5:41 (Frank Zappa); Featuring Jean-Luc Ponty
 "The Steppe" - 5:20 
 "Hacienda" - 5:31 
 "Fab Gear" - 4:54 
 "Raptor" - 5:46 
 "Everlast" - 5:09 (Jeff Lorber, Jimmy Haslip)
 "Playa del Falco" - 4:45 
 "Escapade" - 4:58 
 "Dragonfly" - 4:39 (Jeff Lorber, Jimmy Haslip)

Personnel 
 Jeff Lorber – all keyboards, guitars (1-8, 10, 11), synth bass (2, 11)
 Paul Jackson, Jr. – guitars (1, 6, 7, 8, 10)
 Larry Koonse – guitars (2, 9)
 Michael Thompson – guitars (3, 4, 5, 11)
 Jimmy Haslip – bass (1, 3-11)
 Vinnie Colaiuta – drums (1-9)
 Gary Novak – drums (10)
 Dave Weckl – drums (11)
 Lenny Castro – percussion (1, 4, 5, 7-10)
 Ed Mann – marimba (3)
 David Mann – flute (1, 2, 5, 6, 7, 10, 11), brass (1, 2, 5, 6, 7, 10, 11), saxophone section (1, 2, 5, 6, 7, 10, 11), horn arrangements (1, 2, 5, 6, 7, 10, 11)
 Eric Marienthal – saxophone (1, 2), alto saxophone (4-10), soprano saxophone (11)
 Jean-Luc Ponty – violin (3)

Production 
 Jeff Lorber – producer, recording, mixing (5, 9-11)
 Jimmy Haslip – producer
 David Mann – recording
 Ed Mann – recording
 Michael Thompson – recording
 Michael H. Brauer – mixing (1-4, 8, 10)
 Rich Breen – mastering 
 Raffi Minasian – cover artwork 
 Janet Wolsborn – package design 
 Greg Allen – photography 
 Bud Harner – management

Studios
 Recorded at JHL Sound (Pacific Palisades, CA); Cocoa Butt Studio (Culver City, CA); Gong Vibe Mobile; Studio 107.
 Mixed at Electric Lady Studios (New York City, NY).
 Mastered at Dogmatic Studios (Burbank, CA).

References

2013 albums
Jeff Lorber albums